RMG could apply to any
A common abbreviation for ready-made garment
Bangladeshi RMG Sector, ready-made garments
Royal Mail Group, London Stock Exchange symbol
RMG Connect, former division of JWT, US
 Revolutionary Marxist Group (Canada), 1970s political organization
RMG (program), electronic structure simulation
Team RMG, a German auto racing team

Technology and military
RMG, a multipurpose variant of Russian RPG-27 rocket launcher

Entertainment
RMG (band)
Rover's Morning Glory, radio talk-show by WMMS, Cleveland, Ohio, US